Fabio Mangilli (13 July 1911 – 9 January 1986) was an Italian equestrian. He competed in two events at the 1948 Summer Olympics.

References

External links
 

1911 births
1986 deaths
Italian male equestrians
Olympic equestrians of Italy
Equestrians at the 1948 Summer Olympics